Furuhashi (written: 古橋) is a Japanese surname. Notable people with the surname include:

, Japanese swimmer
, Japanese anime director and screenwriter
, Japanese footballer
, Japanese samurai
, Japanese footballer

Japanese-language surnames